Til ungdommen (English: "To the Youth"), also known by the words of the first line Kringsatt av fiender ("Surrounded by Enemies"), is a poem from 1936 by Norwegian poet and writer Nordahl Grieg (1902–1943) . It was set to music in 1952 by the Danish composer Otto Mortensen (1907–1986). The song has been recorded by various artists and has been sung at meetings held by various organizations. After the terror attacks of 22 July 2011, it was used in many memorial gatherings and services.

History
The poem was written in 1936 by Nordahl Grieg at Ny-Hellesund in Søgne for use by the Norwegian Students' Society after a request by Trond Hegna (1898–1992) who was a Member of Parliament. The poem is directly inspired by the Spanish civil war, which had broken out the same summer. It was set to music by composer Otto Mortensen in 1952, some nine years after Grieg's death.

In 1988 it was recorded by Grex Vocalis. In 2000 it was orchestrated by Tormod Tvete Vik and sung by Norwegian actress and singer Herborg Kråkevik in her CD titled Kråkeviks Songbok. Kråkevik's version excludes verses 7-10.

The song has also been recorded by Danish rock musician Kim Larsen, first on his album 231045-0637 from 1979. However, on this album it was called 682 A rather than Til Ungdommen, a reference to the song's listing in the Danish folk high school songbook. Kim Larsen also included the song on his live album Kim i Cirkus (1985), and on the live CD and DVD  (2007), on these two occasions titling it by the first line in the Danish version of the poem, Kringsat af Fjender.

The song has also been recorded by Norwegian experimental band The Soundbyte. Til Ungdommen was sung by Norwegian singer Torhild Ostad on 23 November 2003 in Kleinmachnow near Berlin, Germany, as the memorial stone was unveiled at the site where the poet Nordahl Grieg died when the Lancaster bomber in which he was flying as a war correspondent hit the ground on 2 December 1943.

On 24 July 2011, under enormous worldwide media coverage, the song was sung by the congregation of the Oslo Cathedral memorial service in relation to the 2011 Norway attacks. It was also sung at Denmark's official Memorial Service at Vor Frue Kirke in Copenhagen on 27 July 2011.

Herborg Kråkevik's 2000 version of the song was re-released in 2011 immediately after the attacks, reaching #1 on VG-lista, the official Norwegian Singles Chart, in its first week of release.

Sissel Kyrkjebø sang the song as the concluding performer during the Norwegian National Memorial Ceremony on 21 August 2011 in the Oslo Spektrum arena, which was held to remember those killed in the 2011 Norway attacks.  The program was broadcast on all TV channels across Norway. Ingebjørg Bratland sang the song on 30 July 2011 in the Oslo Cathedral.

Text of the poem
Til ungdommen by Nordahl Grieg.

English translation 
by Solveig Tofte/Metaphor (2022):

Faced by your enemies 

faced by your time! 

During a bloody storm 

– never resign! 

Fearful your questions are, 

defenseless and open 

What is my armament? 

What is my weapon? 

Here is your battle plan 

Here is your sword: 

Faith in humanity, 

and all that it’s worth 

For all our future’s sake

Find it, sustain it 

Pay any price – but: 

Rise it and strengthen it! 

Silent the weapons go 

Rows upon rows, 

call halt to their deadly drift, 

our spirit grows! 

War is contempt for life

Peace is creation 

Throw all your power in, 

to death’s true damnation 

Love and enrich by dream 

our mighty past! 

Unveil new answers to 

all questions asked 

Water wheels still not built 

Unrevealed planets – 

The brave and ingenuous 

will make a difference! 

Pure is humanity, 

the world full of seed 

Where there is hunger, 

it is born of greed 

Break all iniquity 

Injustice will fall (then) 

Sunrise and bread and soul 

Are owned by all (men) 

Then all the weapons are 

truly ignored 

with human dignity 

Peace is restored 

She who with her right 

hand Carries a burden 

A treasure she must protect 

Cannot commit murder 

Here is our solemn vow 

From man to man: 

Treasure our sacred 

world Water and land

We will keep it close: 

The beauty - affection 

Like carrying an infant 

with Love and protection

Song recordings
The Norwegian duo Metaphor made an english translation and three recorded version of this song in 2022, due to the war in Ukraine
Kim Larsen's version (in 1979) of the song is titled "682A" — a reference to its place in Højskolesangbogen, the Danish Folk High School songbook
The song was performed live in July 1988 by Kim Larsen, Björn Afzelius, Åge Aleksandersen and Jahn Teigen, with verses alternating between Danish and Norwegian. The song was recorded and shown live on television, but never released on CD or vinyl. 
Anders Buaas has recorded his non-vocal version of a song called Til Ungdommen on his musical work "The Witches of Finnmark" (2017).

In popular culture
 The instrumental song Closing the Circle by Danish progressive metal band Beyond Twilight (on their 2001 album The Devil's Hall of Fame) contains melody snippets taken from Til Ungdommen.
 The song Songen Åt Fangen by Norwegian black metal band Vreid (on their debut album Kraft) uses Til Ungdommen as its primary melody.

References

Other sources
 Andreassen, Jostein (1992) Nordahl Grieg på Sørlandet: Et studieheft om forfatterskap og miljø (J. Andreassen) 
 Nag, Martin (1989) Ung må Nordahl Grieg ennå være (Solum) 
 Hoem, Edvard (1989) Til ungdommen : Nordahl Griegs liv (Oslo: Gyldendal) 

Norwegian poems
1936 poems
1952 songs
Number-one singles in Norway